was a railway station in Horonobe, Teshio District, Hokkaidō, Japan. The station closed on 13 March 2021.

Lines
Hokkaido Railway Company
Sōya Main Line Station W69

Layout
Yasuushi Station has a single side platform.

Adjacent stations

References

Stations of Hokkaido Railway Company
Railway stations in Hokkaido Prefecture
Railway stations in Japan opened in 1925
Railway stations closed in 2021